Kenny van Weeghel (born 16 September 1980 in Zwolle) is a Paralympic athlete from the Netherlands competing in the 100, 200 and 400 m T54 class wheelchair racing. He participated in the Paralympic games six times already and he has won 6 Paralympic medals among which two golden ones.

Athletics career
Weeghel won the 200m at the European Championships in 2001. This was his first main title and there were many to come. In 2002 he became World Champion by winning the 100m and a year later he won both the 100m and 200m during the World Championships. At the European Championships that same year (2003) he won the 200m and 400m.

At the 2004 Summer Paralympics in Athens, he won his first three Paralympic medals: bronze on the 100m, silver on the 200m and gold on the 400m. He was elected Dutch handicapped sportsman of the year.

In 2005 the World Championships in Athletics were held in Helsinki and T54 wheelchair racing was added to the program as an exhibition event. In both the 100m and 200m he won the silver medal behind British athlete David Weir.

In 2006, in Assen in the Netherlands, he became once more World Champion 200m, while taking second place (by a mere 0.01 s) on the 100 m behind David Weir.

Van Weeghel won a silver medal at the Paralympic Games in 2012 in London (400m) and won two Paralympic medals at the Rio de Janeiro Paralympic games in 2016; gold for the 400m and bronze for the 100m.

Personal records

Awards 
 Order of the Lion of the Netherlands - 2004
 National disabled sportsman of the year - 2004
 Atletiekunie Paralympic athlete of the year - 2014
 Honorary citizenship of the province of Brabant - 2017

References

External links 
 
 World ranking and athlete information from International Wheelchair and Amputee Sports Federation

1980 births
Living people
Dutch male wheelchair racers
Athletes (track and field) at the 2004 Summer Paralympics
Athletes (track and field) at the 2008 Summer Paralympics
Athletes (track and field) at the 2012 Summer Paralympics
Athletes (track and field) at the 2016 Summer Paralympics
Paralympic athletes of the Netherlands
Paralympic gold medalists for the Netherlands
Paralympic silver medalists for the Netherlands
Paralympic bronze medalists for the Netherlands
Sportspeople from Zwolle
Paralympic wheelchair racers
Medalists at the 2004 Summer Paralympics
Medalists at the 2012 Summer Paralympics
Medalists at the 2016 Summer Paralympics
Medalists at the World Para Athletics Championships
Medalists at the World Para Athletics European Championships
Paralympic medalists in athletics (track and field)